Paulo José Lopes de Figueiredo (born 28 November 1972) is an Angolan retired footballer who played as a central midfielder.

He spent the bulk of his 17-year professional career with Santa Clara, amassing Primeira Liga totals of 97 matches and eight goals during three seasons (eight in total with the club).

An Angolan international for five years, Figueiredo earned 38 caps and represented the nation at the 2006 World Cup and two Africa Cup of Nations tournaments.

Club career
Figueiredo was born in Malanje, Portuguese Angola to Portuguese settlers, moving to the land of his parents at the age of three. From 1991 to 1996 he played for five clubs, including one spell at C.F. Os Belenenses for which he featured only once in the second division in the 1991–92 season.

In summer 1996, Figueiredo signed for C.D. Santa Clara in the second level, scoring five goals in 33 matches in his third year as the team promoted to the Primeira Liga for the first time ever. He made his debut in the competition on 22 August 1999 in a 2–2 home draw against Sporting CP, and made 31 league appearances matches during the 1999–2000 campaign, but the Azores side were immediately relegated back.

After four more seasons with Santa Clara (two in the top flight) and nearly 300 official games, Figueiredo moved to the Portuguese lower leagues, splitting 2004–05 with Sport Clube Dragões Sandinenses and S.C. Lusitânia. He then signed with Sweden's Östers IF, being relegated in his first and only season in the Allsvenskan.

Figueiredo spent 2007–08 with FC Ceahlăul Piatra Neamț in Romania and C.D. Olivais e Moscavide in Portugal, without any competitive appearances for the former team. Subsequently, he closed out his career in his homeland after two years with C.R.D. Libolo.

International career
In 2003, aged almost 31, Figueiredo was invited to play for Angola, and returned for the first time in almost 30 years to the country of his birth. After featuring heavily during the 2006 FIFA World Cup qualifying campaign – ten games, one goal against Nigeria on 18 June 2005, in a 1–1 away draw– he was selected to the final stages in Germany, playing in all three group stage matches as the Palancas Negras managed two draws in their first participation ever.

Figueiredo also featured at two Africa Cup of Nations tournaments — a group stage exit in 2006 and a quarter-final finish two years later.

International goals
(Angola score listed first, score column indicates score after each Figueiredo goal)

References

External links

 

1972 births
Living people
Footballers from Malanje
Angolan people of Portuguese descent
Angolan footballers
Portuguese footballers
Association football midfielders
Primeira Liga players
Liga Portugal 2 players
Segunda Divisão players
C.F. Os Belenenses players
U.F.C.I. Tomar players
C.D. Aves players
O Elvas C.A.D. players
C.D. Santa Clara players
S.C. Lusitânia players
S.C. Dragões Sandinenses players
Varzim S.C. players
C.D. Olivais e Moscavide players
Allsvenskan players
Östers IF players
CSM Ceahlăul Piatra Neamț players
Girabola players
C.R.D. Libolo players
Angola international footballers
2006 FIFA World Cup players
2006 Africa Cup of Nations players
2008 Africa Cup of Nations players
Angolan expatriate footballers
Expatriate footballers in Sweden
Expatriate footballers in Romania
Angolan expatriate sportspeople in Romania